Mahamud Ibrahim Adeer sometimes referred to as Aw Maxamuud was a Somali ruler. He was the second Sultan of the Sultanate of the Geledi. He defeated early challengers to the new Sultanate and incorporated some Rahanweyn and Hawiye subclans under Geledi rule.

History

Early life
Mahamud was the son of the first Geledi Sultan Ibrahim Adeer. He received religious education and was conferred the honorific Aw or Sheikh, signifying his status as a learned individual.

Reign
His rule marked the consolidation of the newly formed Geledi Sultanate. Echoing the battles his father fought in the decades prior it was under Mahamud's reign that the Geledi would defeat a Silcis and Gorgarte Hawiye resurgence that threatened to bring back their oppressive rule. As well, the powerful Hintire and Hubeer clans united against the Geledi but were defeated and enveloped into the Sultanate. Following his death, Mahamud's son Yusuf Mahamud Ibrahim would succeed him and take Geledi power to its greatest extent.

See also
Somali aristocratic and court titles

References

17th-century Somalian people
18th-century Somalian people
Gobroon dynasty
Somalian religious leaders
Somalian Muslims
Ajuran Sultanate
17th-century monarchs in Africa
18th-century monarchs in Africa
18th-century deaths
Year of birth unknown